The 1919 Washington & Jefferson Presidents football team was an American football team that represented Washington & Jefferson College as an independent during the 1919 college football season. David C. Morrow returned for his fifth season a head coach, having helmed the team from 1908 to 1911. Washington & Jefferson compiled a record of 6–2 and outscored opponents by a total of 125 to 14.

Schedule

References

Washington and Jefferson
Washington & Jefferson Presidents football seasons
Washington and Jefferson Presidents football